Mae Kha may refer to:
 Mae Kha Subdistrict (50091000), a subdistrict in Fang District, Chiang Mai Province, Thailand
 Mae Kha Subdistrict (50091100), a subdistrict in Fang District, Chiang Mai Province, Thailand
 Mae Kha moat, a former stream and moat of the city of Chiang Mai, Thailand

See also 
 Mae Ka (disambiguation)